Bowling Green High School may refer to:

Bowling Green High School (Kentucky)
Bowling Green High School (Missouri)
Bowling Green High School (Ohio)